The 2008 San Diego State Aztecs football team represented San Diego State University in the 2008 NCAA Division I FBS football season.  They were coached by Chuck Long and played their home games at Qualcomm Stadium.  The 2008 season was expected to be rough for the Aztecs after losing several key offensive players to the National Football League (NFL).  The team looked to redshirt freshman quarterback Ryan Lindley to replace star quarterback Kevin O'Connell.  The team also lost two of its leading wide receivers in Brett Swain and Chaz Schilens along with four starting offensive linemen.

Schedule

Game summaries

Cal Poly
See also 2008 Cal Poly Mustangs football team

at Notre Dame
See also 2008 Notre Dame Fighting Irish football team

at San Jose State
See also 2008 San Jose State Spartans football team

Idaho
See also 2008 Idaho Vandals football team

at TCU
See also 2008 TCU Horned Frogs football team

Air Force
See also 2008 Air Force Falcons football team

at New Mexico
See also 2008 New Mexico Lobos football team

Colorado State
See also 2008 Colorado State Rams football team

at Wyoming

at No. 17 BYU

This will be the 33rd game between San Diego State and BYU.

BYU Leads Series 25-7-1

Utah
See also 2008 Utah Utes football team

UNLV

Statistics

Awards
1st Team Preseason All Mountain West- LB Russell Allen

2nd Team Preseason All Mountain West- WR Darren Mougey and LB Luke Laolagi

3rd Team Preseason All Mountain West- WR Vincent Brown and DB Corey Boudreaux

References

San Diego State
San Diego State Aztecs football seasons
San Diego State Aztecs football